Edward "Ted" Copeland (19 May 1921 – 12 July 2001) was an English professional footballer who played for Newcastle United, Hartlepool United and Spennymoor United. Born in Hetton-le-Hole, County Durham. Copeland was a winger.

Club career

Copeland played in the Wartime League for Newcastle United F.C. Originally signed in 1939 as an amateur, he played games throughout the war alongside United legends Jackie Milburn and Albert Stubbins.

Copeland signed as a Professional on 20 August 1943 and received roughly £2 a month. Copelands first game for Newcastle United came as they took on Bradford Park Avenue A.F.C. and they went on to win the game 2–1, in front of a crowd of 10,000. He scored his first and second goals away to Gateshead on 18 December 1943, in the Football League North First Championship. His third goal came on 5 February at Middlesbrough in a 2–1 loss in the Football League North/War Cup Qualifying. He appeared in 4 Tyne-Wear derby games. Copeland played an overall 20 games as Newcastles number 7, replaced the next season by Jackie Milburn.

Signed by Fred Westgarth again for Hartlepool United F.C. on a free transfer in 1944-45 for a second spell with the club, he played a total of 16 games scoring 3 goals. Two were scored in consecutive weeks, in wins versus York City F.C. and Darlington F.C. at Victoria Park, the latter away to Leeds United F.C. on 18 November.

Ted played in Hartlepools first post-war time game on 31 August 1946, they wore the Blue and White striped shirts and black shorts. Going on to draw with Barrow 1-1.

Copeland stayed on another two seasons for Pools until the 1947–1948 season appearing in a total of 81 games overall for Hartlepools scoring on 17 occasions, before moving to Spennymoor United. He was Hartlepools 7th highest war-time appearance maker and 10th highest goalscorer during these years.

Copelands photograph and pay packet are available to see in Newcastle United F.C.'s Milburn Entrance on a Stadium Tour at St. James' Park.

Personal life

Copeland worked at Easington Colliery Pit as an Electrician.

Edward Copelands' son, Ted Copeland went on to manage the England women's national football team.

Honours

Clubs
Blackhall Colliery Welfare
 Wearside Football League Winner (1): 1938–39 Wearside Football League
Spennymoor Town F.C.
 1948-49 Northern Football League Winner (1)

References

1921 births
2001 deaths
Footballers from County Durham
English footballers
Newcastle United F.C. players
Hartlepool United F.C. players
Spennymoor United F.C. players
English Football League players
Blackhall Colliery Welfare F.C. players
Association football wingers